Nicholas Wurmser,, was a 14th-century Gothic painter from Strasbourg, Alsace. He was active in Prague, Bohemia, where he worked as a court painter of Emperor Charles IV.

References

Artists from Strasbourg
Painters from Alsace
14th-century German painters
Gothic painters
Court painters
1298 births
1367 deaths
German male painters